Yamaha MotoGP Racing or Yamaha Factory Racing is the official Italian-Japanese factory team of Yamaha in MotoGP.

The team was founded in 1999 following the retirement of Wayne Rainey, who had run a factory-supported team in the 500 cc class for the previous two years, with Kenny Roberts and Giacomo Agostini having run their own works supported teams before him. The team was originally based in the Netherlands but was relocated in Italy in 2002.

History

Biaggi achieved a total of 8 race wins in that period, first riding the Yamaha YZR500 and later the Yamaha YZR-M1 in 2002.

In , Checa was joined by Marco Melandri. The team had an average season with no podium finishes. For , Valentino Rossi joined Checa at the team. Rossi got 9 wins and won the championship. Rossi earned 5 wins and finished 2nd in the championship. For the  season, both riders remained with the team riding the new 800cc Yamaha YZR-M1. Rossi had 4 wins and finished the season 3rd overall.

For , Yamaha had a unique line-up with Rossi being joined in the team by Jorge Lorenzo. Although the pair were fighting for the title from different pit boxes (as Rossi chose to use Bridgestone tyres and as Lorenzo continued with Michelin), Yamaha operated as one team and not two separate entities. The title was won dominantly by Rossi who won 9 of the 18 races and finished on the podium in every race except for two. Even though this was the learning year for Lorenzo, he was able to cruise to victory at Estoril and finished 4th in the championship. In , Yamaha dominated MotoGP with Rossi winning the title and Lorenzo finishing second. The pair won 12 out of the 17 races, and Yamaha won the Constructors' Championship.

After seven years with Yamaha, Rossi left the team to compete with Ducati for two seasons. He rejoined Yamaha again for the 2013 MotoGP season.

Grand Prix motorcycle results
(key) (Races in bold indicate pole position; races in italics indicate fastest lap)

MotoGP results

By rider

By year

(key)

See also
 Monster Energy Yamaha Factory

Notes

References

External links

Motorcycle racing teams
Motorsport in Japan
1999 establishments in the Netherlands
Motorcycle racing teams established in 1999